Galal Ibrahim (died 25 November 2021) was a two-time president of Cairo-based football club Zamalek SC. He worked with the judiciary as a consultant and served as head of the Criminal Court. He headed Zamalek SC from 1992 to 1996, and took over the presidency of the club for a second time in 2010 after the invalidation of the May 2009 election, which Mamdouh Abbas won. However, Ibrahim resigned in August 2011 due to financial stress.

References

20th-century births
2021 deaths
Zamalek SC presidents
Judges from Cairo
Year of birth missing